The 2012 Mountain West Conference football season was the 14th season of college football for the Mountain West Conference (MW). In the 2012 NCAA Division I FBS football season, the MW had 10 football members: Air Force, Boise State, Colorado State, Fresno State, Hawaiʻi, Nevada, New Mexico, San Diego State, UNLV, and Wyoming.

This was the second consecutive year in which the Mountain West saw changes in membership. After losing two of its charter members in 2011—BYU (WCC and football independent) and Utah (Pac-12)—the MW lost TCU, members since 2005, to the Big 12 in 2012. The conference reloaded with three new members—full conference members Fresno State and Nevada, and football-only Hawaiʻi.

This was originally intended to be the last season for Boise State and San Diego State in the MW. After the 2012–13 school year, both schools' football programs planned to join the Big East. Both schools also planned to join the Big West, a former conference home of both, for non-football sports. San Diego State, a charter member of the Big West, was set to return to that conference after a 35-year absence; Boise State was set to return after a 12-year absence. However, due to major instability in the Big East, culminating in the mass exodus of the conference's seven basketball-first schools in December 2012, Boise State chose to remain in the MW for 2013 and beyond. San Diego State has since sought to remain in the MW, and as a part of Boise State's agreement to remain in the MW, the conference must offer an invitation to San Diego State to remain in the MW before it can invite any other school.

In addition, San Jose State and Utah State will join the MW in 2013.

Previous season

Preseason

Award watch lists
The following Mountain West players were named to preseason award watch lists.

Maxwell Award:

Chuck Bednarik Award:

John Mackey Award:

Fred Biletnikoff Award:

Bronko Nagurski Trophy:

Outland Trophy:

Jim Thorpe Award:

Lombardi Award:

Rimington Trophy:

Davey O'Brien Award:

Doak Walker Award:

Walter Camp Award:

Lott Trophy:

Lou Groza Award:

Mountain West media days

Media poll

All–Conference Team

Offense
QB Derek Carr, Jr, Fresno State
RB Stefphon Jefferson, Jr, Nevada
RB Robbie Rouse, Sr, Fresno State
WR Davante Adams, Fr, Fresno State
WR Brandon Wimberly, Grad, Nevada
TE Gavin Escobar, Jr, San Diego State
OL Jeff Nady, Sr, Nevada
OL Austin Wentworth, Jr, Fresno State
OL Matt Paradis, Jr, Boise State
OL Nick Carlson, Sr, Wyoming
OL Nik Embernate, Sr, San Diego State

Defense
DL Mike Atkinson, Sr, Boise State
DL DeMarcus Lawrence, So, Boise State
DL Tyeler Davidson, So, Fresno State
DL Mike Purcell, Sr, Wyoming
LB J.C. Percy, Sr, Boise State
LB Albert Rosette, Grad, Nevada
LB John Lotulelei, Sr, UNLV
DB Jamar Taylor, Sr, Boise State
DB Phillip Thomas, Sr, Fresno State
DB Derron Smith, So, Fresno State
DB Leon McFadden, Sr, San Diego State

Specialists
PK Nolan Kohorst, Jr, UNLV
P Pete Kontodiakos, Sr, Colorado State
KR/PR Mike Edwards, Jr, Hawaii

Coaches
NOTE: Stats shown are before the beginning of the season

*first year as conference member, ^achieved as head coach of New Mexico from 99–08

Rankings

Mountain West vs. BCS matchups

Bowl games
The Mountain West Conference will have agreements with the following bowls for 2012–13:
 The MW champion will receive an automatic berth in one of the five BCS bowl games if they are the highest ranked non-automatic qualifying conference champion and either of the following:
 Ranked in the top 12 of the BCS Rankings. (Utah qualified under this criterion in 2004-05 and 2008–09, and TCU in 2009-10 and 2010–11.)
 Ranked in the top 16 of the BCS Rankings and its ranking is higher than that of an automatic qualifying conference champion.

If Hawai‘i is bowl eligible and not MW champions or selected for a BCS bowl, they will receive a berth in the Hawai‘i Bowl.

Regular season

All dates, times, and TV are tentative and subject to change.

The Mountain West has teams in 3 different time zones. Times reflect start time in respective time zone of each team (Mountain—Air Force, Boise State, Colorado State, New Mexico, Wyoming; Pacific—Fresno State, Nevada, San Diego State, UNLV; Hawaii-Aleutian—Hawaiʻi). Conference games start times are that of the home team.

Week One

Home attendance

References